A number of steamships have been named Celia, including:

, a cargo ship in service 1883–91
, a cargo ship in service 1906–21
, a Hansa A Type cargo ship in service 1944–45